Simran Kaur Mundi is an Indian actress who made her acting debut in the Hindi film Jo Hum Chahein in 2011. Prior to that she was a model who was crowned Miss India Universe 2008 in Mumbai on 5 April 2008.

Biography
Born in Mumbai, she belongs to a Jat family from Mundian Jattan, Hoshiarpur, Punjab, India. She studied for two years in Delhi Public School, Vijaipur, Guna Madhya Pradesh and later completed her schooling from the boarding school Scindia Kanya Vidyalaya, Gwalior, Madhya Pradesh. She completed her Bio-Technology degree from the Holkar College of Science Indore in 2007. After her graduation she moved back to Mumbai and worked with Fame Cinemas in Andheri – as a guest relations executive, where she exclusively managed bookings for professionals from the film and media industry.

While working at Fame Cinemas she got noticed by Bharat and Dorris, one of the top make up artists in show business who encouraged her to participate in the Femina Miss India 2008 pageant.  Even without having any formal modelling experience under her belt, she still went on to compete with the country's best and win the title, she was crowned Femina Miss India Universe 2008. She then went on to represent India at the Miss Universe 2008 pageant held at the Diamond Bay Resort in Nha Trang, Vietnam on 13 July 2008, where she placed 1st runner-up in the Beach Beauty Competition, 2nd runner-up in the Evening Gown Contest and 4th in the National Costume Round.

Modelling and pageantry

Femina Miss India 2008

She was crowned Femina Miss India Universe 2008 by the outgoing titleholder Puja Gupta.

Miss Universe 2008

She represented India at Miss Universe 2008 held in Vietnam and placed in various preliminary events, she was one of the top five finalists at the Best in Swimsuit round, placed in the top 5 of Charming Ao-dai round and was the group winner at the national costume award.

After Miss Universe 2008
After winning the Femina Miss India Universe title in 2008, she started modelling professionally. She modeled at the Lakme India Fashion Weeks 2008–2011, Wills India Fashion Weeks 2010, 2011, India Couture Weeks 2008–2010, Dubai Fashion Week, NIFD, NIFT and many others. She also walked the red carpet for the film Outrage at the Cannes film festival in 2010 and also walked the ramp at the Cannes Fashion Paranoia 2010.

She was one of the judges at Femina Miss India Delhi 2013, Femina Miss India Chandigarh 2013 and Elite Model Look India 2014.

She's also done a few commercials where she endorsed Parachute 'Hot Oil' in 2008, apart from doing various other print and commercial campaigns. She worked in a music video for renowned Punjabi music composer and singer Sukshinder Shinda titled "La la la la" from the album Jadoo released on 2 December 2010.

Television career
In January 2011, she was seen on Indian Television in the reality game show Zor Ka Jhatka: Total Wipeout, anchored by Shah Rukh Khan. She won the seventh episode and found her place among the 15 finalists in the final episode. In January 2013, Mundi made her debut as a host for the first ever Hockey India League, where she anchored matches played all across the country for over a month.
In 2019 she co-hosted Saturday Morning Live Show along with Rannvijay Singh and Manas Singh where they discussed Basketball matches played in the NBA aired on Sony Pictures Networks India. She anchored the first ever NBA India Games 2019 along with Scott Fresh, which featured Sacramento Kings and Indiana Pacers at the Dome, NSCI, SVP Stadium on 4 and 5 October 2019.

Film career
Mundi made her acting debut in Bollywood with the film Jo Hum Chahein on 16 December 2011 opposite newcomer Sunny Gill which released to a lukewarm response at the box office but she received positive appreciation for her performance.  In July 2013 she made her Punjabi Film debut opposite Punjabi superstar Gippy Grewal and Punjabi musical legend Jazzy Bains in the film Best of Luck, which had the third highest opening day (Rs 7.1 million) and weekend (Rs 22.4 million) for a Punjabi film at the time of release and went on to create a spot amongst the top grossing Punjabi films. In September 2013, Mundi made her debut in Tollywood with the film Potugadu, opposite Telugu movie star Manoj Manchu which took a blockbuster opening on release.

Her next Bollywood film Kuku Mathur Ki Jhand Ho Gayi produced by Ekta Kapoor's Balaji Motion Pictures and Bejoy Nambiar released on the same day as her Punjabi film Mundeyan Ton Bachke Rahin on 30 May 2014 and she had to juggle the promotions of both films at the same time.  She was next seen on screen opposite comedian Kapil Sharma, who made his acting debut in the film Kis Kisko Pyaar Karoon, directed by Abbas Mustan.

Filmography

Films

Music videos

Web series

Personal life 
Mundi married Gurickk Maan, son of Punjabi singer and actor Gurdas Maan, on 31 January 2020 in Patiala.

See also

List of Indian film actresses

References

External links

 
 
 
 Simran Mundi Profile at Femina Miss India

Female models from Mumbai
Living people
21st-century Indian actresses
Indian film actresses
Actresses in Hindi cinema
Femina Miss India winners
Miss Universe 2008 contestants
Indian Sikhs
Punjabi people
Actresses from Mumbai
Year of birth missing (living people)